Youssouf Koné may refer to:

 Youssouf Koné (footballer, born 1983), Côte d'Ivoire footballer for Latina Calcio
 Youssouf Koné (footballer, born 1995), Malian footballer for Olympique Lyonnais

See also
 Yssouf Koné (born 1982), Burkinabé footballer